The Iška is a river of central Slovenia. Part of the river valley—the Iška Gorge or Iška Canyon—separates Lower Carniola from Inner Carniola. After flowing past Strahomer, the river follows an almost straight line and joins the Ljubljanica River, and therefore belongs to the Sava and Black Sea basins.

The part of the river between Iška Vas and Strahomer disappeared underground during the 2010 Slovenia floods, on the night of 20 September 2010.

References

External links
 
 Condition of the Iška - graphs of water level and flow data for the past 30 days (taken in Iška Vas by ARSO)

Rivers of Inner Carniola
Rivers of Ljubljana